Fritz Millinger (born 19 September 1935) is a retired German football defender and later manager.

References

1935 births
Living people
German football managers
1. FC Normannia Gmünd managers
Stuttgarter Kickers managers
VfB Stuttgart managers
1. FC Heidenheim managers